Slightly Odway is the debut studio album by Australian alternative rock band Jebediah. It was recorded between March and May 1997 at Sing Sing Studios in Melbourne, with Neill King producing. Slightly Odway was released on 8 September 1997 by record label Murmur.

It peaked at number 7 on the ARIA Albums Chart, and appeared in the top 50 for non-consecutive runs totalling 54 weeks.

Recording 
The group's line-up of Chris Daymond on lead guitar, Kevin Mitchell on lead vocals and rhythm guitar, Vanessa Thornton on bass guitar and Kevin's older brother, Brett Mitchell, on drums started recording Slightly Odway in March 1997 with United Kingdom's Neill King (The Smiths, Madness, Elvis Costello) producing.

Content 
According to Australian music journalist Ed Nimmervoll, the title "is a comment on the slightly odd way they feel they approach life as well as music".

In March 2002 Kevin reflected on his song writing "It didn't bother me that people didn't pick up on the lyrics. I'd made a conscious effort to focus on lyrics, because there were some lyrics on Slightly Odway that I was a little embarrassed about, ones where I hadn't really been trying. But I certainly didn't want vindication or attention for what I'd written."

Album cover 
The bowling green on the artwork of the album is the Kardinya Bowling Club, where bass player Vanessa Thornton's grandparents played. The spaceship is in fact a Futuro house that was located on the corner of Leach Highway and Karel Avenue in Willetton, close to where the band members grew up. The structure was used as part of a sales office for a nearby residential subdivision and was removed in 1996, after being donated to the Barking Gecko Theatre Company.

Critical reception 

In his retrospective review, Jonathan Lewis of AllMusic wrote that Slightly Odway "shows Jebediah as a talented young band, despite the flimsy songwriting and the lack of light and shade on the album. Once Jebediah learn they don't need to bludgeon the audience with their guitar-playing they will be better off for it." Lewis preferred the earlier version of "Jerks of Attention", which is "one of their finest songs", over the album version, which was "a half-paced version of the original single: it certainly doesn't improve it."

In May 2011 Matt Neal of The Warrnambool Standard felt the album was "packed with big power chords, frontman Kevin "Bob Evans" Mitchell's distinctive sing-through-your-nose approach, inspired bursts of guitar noise and a love of crowd-friendly melodies. Some of it hasn't aged well".

Recognition 
In 2011, the album placed at number 15 in a list of the greatest 100 Australian albums compiled by Australian youth radio station Triple J.

Track listing

Personnel 

 Jebediah
 Kevin Mitchell – guitar, keyboards, vocals
 Chris Daymond – guitar, percussion, vocals
 Brett Mitchell – drums, percussion, vocals
 Vanessa Thornton – bass

 Additional musicians
 DJ Rub-A-Dub – vocals on "Teflon"
 Helen Mountford – cello
 Michelle, Kim, Mindy, Tom, Heath, Brendon, Steph, Neill – vocals on "La Di Da Da"

 Technical personnel
 Neill King – production, engineering, mixing
 Superdave Davis – production, engineering and mixing assistance
 Steve Smart – mastering
 Heath Bradby – management 
 John "Wombo" O'Donnell – A&R
 Ben Steele – sleeve design and layout
 Nick Cowie – sleeve photography
 Chris Digby – sleeve photography

Charts

Weekly charts

Year-end charts

References

External links 
 Slightly Odway on Jebediah's official website

1997 debut albums
Jebediah albums
Murmur (record label) albums